Brian Nana-Sinkam (born December 31, 1994) is an American soccer player who played for Seattle Sounders FC 2 in the USL.

Career

Youth, College and Amateur
Nana-Sinkam spent his youth career with PA Classics from 2009 to 2013 before signing a letter of intent to play college soccer at Stanford University.  He made a total of 71 appearances for the Cardinal and finished his career with one goal and two assists.

He also played in the Premier Development League for Burlingame Dragons FC.

Professional
On January 13, 2017, Nana-Sinkam was drafted in the first round (22nd overall) of the 2017 MLS SuperDraft by Seattle Sounders FC.  However, he did not make the final cut in preseason.  He signed with USL affiliate club Seattle Sounders FC 2 on March 22.  Four days later, he made his professional debut and scored in a 2–1 defeat to Sacramento Republic.

References

External links
Sounders FC 2 bio
Stanford University bio

1994 births
Living people
American soccer players
Association football defenders
Burlingame Dragons FC players
People from Lititz, Pennsylvania
Seattle Sounders FC draft picks
Tacoma Defiance players
Soccer players from Pennsylvania
Stanford Cardinal men's soccer players
USL Championship players
USL League Two players
Sportspeople from Lancaster, Pennsylvania